(born 20 May 1977 in Ōshū, Iwate Prefecture) is a Japanese former rugby union player who played as wing.

Career

Hojo started to play rugby union for Nihon University rugby union team until 2000, when he graduated. A year later, he joined Suntory Sungoliath, where played until 2010, with which he won the All-Japan Rugby Football Championship in 2000, after a draw with Kobe Steel. He was also part of an independent Suntory team which defeated Wales in 2001. In 2003, he was called up by the national coach Shogo Mukai for the Japan squad for the 2003 Rugby World Cup. However, he did not play at the tournament. He retired from rugby in 2011.

References

External links
Junichi Hojo profile at JRFU
Junichi Hojo Top League statistics

1977 births
Nihon University alumni
Japanese rugby union players
Sportspeople from Iwate Prefecture
Tokyo Sungoliath players
Japan international rugby union players
Rugby union wings
Living people